Mohamed Ahmed Adel Hekal (23 March 1934 – 22 September 2018) was an Egyptian footballer who played as a goalkeeper for Al-Ahly. He also played for the Egyptian national team, and was part of the team that won the 1959 Africa Cup of Nations, and represented his country in the 1960 Summer Olympics.

Honours
 Africa Cup of Nations: 1959

Artistic activity
He appeared as a guest of honor at the movie A Rumor of Love (Eshaet Hob ) in 1959 as himself, he also appeared at the movie Schoolgirl Diary (Mozakarat Telmeza ) in 1962, and Talk of the City (Hadeth Al-Madina ) in 1964.

References

External links
 

1934 births
2018 deaths
Egyptian footballers
Association football goalkeepers
Egypt international footballers
Al Ahly SC players
1959 African Cup of Nations players
1962 African Cup of Nations players
Olympic footballers of Egypt
Footballers at the 1960 Summer Olympics
Africa Cup of Nations-winning players
Egyptian Premier League players
Footballers from Cairo